Zurzach District is a district in the Swiss Canton of Aargau. The district capital is Bad Zurzach. It covers the Studenland area and is located in the northeastern part of the canton.

Geography
Of this area,  or 43.9% is used for agricultural purposes, while  or 39.4% is forested. Of the rest of the land,  or 12.8% is settled (buildings or roads). The district is situated around the confluence of the Aare and Rhine.

Demographics
, 25.7% of the population are foreign nationals.

Economy
 there were 15,454 workers who lived in the district.  Of these, 11,295 or about 73.1% of the residents worked outside the district while 6,024 people commuted into the district for work.  There were a total of 10,183 jobs (of at least 6 hours per week) in the district.

Religion
Of the rest of the population, there were 65 individuals (or about 0.22% of the population) who belonged to the Christian Catholic faith.

Education
Of the school age population, there are 2,405 students attending primary school, there are 972 students attending secondary school, there are 756 students attending tertiary or university level schooling in the municipality.

Municipalities

Mergers
The following changes to the district's municipalities have occurred since 2000:

1 January 2014: Unterendingen merged into Endingen.

1 January 2022: Bad Zurzach, Baldingen, Böbikon, Kaiserstuhl, Rekingen, Rietheim, Rümikon and Wislikofen merged into the new municipality of Zurzach.

References

Districts of Aargau